Eric Harrison (1892–1974) was an Australian politician and member for Wentworth (1931–1956).

Eric Harrison may also refer to:

Eric Harrison (British Army officer) (1893–1987), British military officer, athlete, and author
Eric Harrison (footballer) (1938–2019), English football player and coach
Eric Harrison (RAAF officer) (1886–1945), Australian aviator and founding member of the Royal Australian Air Force
Eric Harrison Jr., Trinidad and Tobago athlete
Eric Fairweather Harrison (1880–1948), Australian politician and member for Bendigo (1931–1937)

See also
Eric Harris (disambiguation)